Hua is a genus of freshwater snails with an operculum, an aquatic gastropod mollusks in the family Semisulcospiridae.

Species
Species within the genus Hua include:
 Hua aristarchorum (Heude, 1889)
 Hua aubryana (Heude, 1889)
 Hua bailleti (Bavay & Dautzenberg, 1910)
 Hua diminuta (Boettger, 1887)
 Hua friniana (Heude, 1889)
 Hua funingensis L.-N. Du, Köhler, X.-Y. Chen & J.-X. Yang, 2019
 Hua jacqueti (Dautzenberg & H. Fischer, 1906)
 Hua kunmingensis L.-N. Du, Köhler, G.-H. Yu, X.-Y. Chen & J.-X. Yang, 2019
 Hua liuii L-N. Du, Köhler, G.-H. Yu, X.-Y. Chen & J.-X. Yang, 2019
 Hua oreadarum (Heude, 1889)
 Hua praenotata (Gredler, 1884)
 Hua scrupea (Fulton, 1914)
 Hua tchangsii L-N. Du, Köhler, G.-H. Yu, X.-Y. Chen & J.-X. Yang, 2019
 Hua telonaria (Heude, 1889)
 Hua textrix (Heude, 1889)
 Hua toucheana (Heude, 1889)
 Hua vultuosa (Fulton, 1914)
Synonyms
 Hua (Namrutua) Abbott, 1948: synonym of Semisulcospira O. Böttger, 1886
 Hua leprosa (Heude, 1889): synonym of Hua telonaria (Heude, 1889) (junior synonym)
 Hua schmackeri (Böttger, 1886): synonym of Hua praenotata (Gredler, 1884) (junior synonym)

References

 Strong, E. & Köhler, F., 2009. Morphological and molecular analysis of 'Melania' jacqueti Dautzenberg & Fischer, 1906: from anonymous orphan to critical basal offshoot of the Semisulcospiridae (Gastropda: Cerithioidea). Zoologica Scripta 38: 483-502

External links
 
 Chen, S.-F. [Sui-Fong. (1943). Two new genera, two new species, and two new names of Chinese Melaniidae. Nautilus. 57: 19-21]
 Du, L.-N. [Li-Na; Köhler, F.; Yu, G.-H. [Guo-Hua]; Chen, X.-Y. [Xiao-Yong]; Yang, J.-X. [Jun-Xing]. (2019). Comparative morpho-anatomy and mitochondrial phylogeny of the Semisulcospiridae of Yunnan, southwestern China, with description of four new species (Gastropoda, Cerithioidea). Invertebrate systematics. 33: 825-848]

Semisulcospiridae
Gastropod genera